The 1996 Oakfield tornado outbreak was a small, but destructive outbreak of 12 tornadoes that struck Wisconsin on July 18, 1996. The worst event was an F5 tornado that severely damaged the village of Oakfield, Wisconsin. The outbreak killed one person and injured 13.

Meteorological synopsis
Strong thunderstorms brought heavy rains, lightning, and gusty winds to the south east central region of Wisconsin. All of these elements resulted from the passage of a strong upper level disturbance over an extremely unstable airmass.

Confirmed tornadoes

Oakfield, Wisconsin

At 6:05 p.m., the tornado developed outside of town and moved eastward across Fond du Lac County, directly towards Oakfield. At 7:15 p.m. the violent tornado struck the village, injuring 12 people and causing $39.5 million (1996 USD) in damage. Out of the 327 homes in Oakfield, 47 were destroyed, and an additional 56 homes, as well as numerous businesses and churches, suffered heavy damage. A state of emergency was declared by then-Wisconsin Governor Tommy Thompson allowing National Guard soldiers to be called in to aid victims and clear debris.

The tornado was strong enough to level the Friday Canning Company, sweeping up millions of empty cans and leaving them scattered over a  radius. Crops, livestock, and farm equipment were also destroyed. The original National Weather Service report from Milwaukee/Sullivan categorized the tornado to be an F3 to F4 tornado on the Fujita scale. It was later upgraded to an F5, the most intense category tornado possible. It would be the only F5 tornado to hit the United States that year. The tornado was documented by at least three experienced storm chasers.

See also
 List of F5 and EF5 tornadoes
 List of North American tornadoes and tornado outbreaks

Notes

References

External links
Oakfield Tornado write-up from the National Weather Service
Photographs of tornado from storm chaser
Aerial photographs from a day and a half later
Map of July 18, 1996 tornadoes

F5 tornadoes
Tornadoes of 1996
Tornadoes in Wisconsin
Oakfield Tornado 1996
Oakfield tornado
Tornado 1996-07
Tornado 1996-07